Two locations now in Poland were previously known by the German name of Steinort

Gleźnowo
Sztynort